The final battle in Caratacus's resistance to Roman rule was fought in 50 AD. The Romans under Publius Ostorius Scapula defeated the Britons and in the aftermath captured Caratacus himself, since 43 the leader of armed opposition to the Roman conquest of Britain. He was paraded through Rome and given the opportunity to make a speech before the emperor Claudius, who spared his life and those of his family and retainers.

Prelude
Tacitus outlines the campaigns leading up to the battle:

Location

Tacitus' account limits the location to the territory of the Ordovices, whose boundaries are no longer known. It included a large area of what is now central and northern Wales. He gives several details, which limit, but do not conclusively identify, the site of the battle:  His topographical details thus include an un-named river, fordable in some stretches, tactically close to high hills offering inaccessible slopes and many loose rocks, possibly scree, but also some paths up with gentler gradients, which trained men could climb while closely packed together in testudo formation.

Various sites have been claimed by local legends, though no suggested location has achieved academic plausibility nor fulfilled all of Tacitus' elements. Tacitus does not name the river, but some local historians have supposed that it is the Severn. The hill fort on Caer Caradoc Hill in Shropshire is connected with the battle by virtue of its name. Local legend places it at British Camp in the Malvern Hills. However, the Severn, though visible from the Malvern Hills, is too distant to fit Tacitus's description of the site, and the Severn is not visible from Caer Caradoc Hill. A position just west of Caersws, Cefn Carnedd where the remains of earthworks still stand, has also been suggested.

Pre-battle speeches
On this occasion Tacitus does not follow the common practice of inventing the specific words spoken by the leaders or men. On the British side he reports: 

Facing a strong position full of aroused fighting men, Ostorius was not keen on a frontal assault. Tacitus reports: 

The Roman troops, who had by this point been trudging around Wales after Caratacus for some years, were eager for a decisive fight.

The battle
Ostorius took note of the paths up the slopes facing his men. He launched his men over the fordable sections of the river. The Roman soldiers came under a rain of missiles, but employed the testudo formation to protect themselves and dismantled the stone ramparts. Once inside the defences, the Romans broke through in bloody fighting. The Britons withdrew to the hilltops, but the Romans kept up the attack by both auxiliaries and legionaries. The Britons were generally without body armour or helmets and they broke and fled; the Roman troops then closely pursued the fugitives. Tacitus reports:

Aftermath
Tacitus writes: 

Caratacus himself escaped. He fled north, seeking refuge among the Brigantes. The Brigantian queen, Cartimandua, depended on Rome for her personal position, and she handed him over to the Romans in chains. Tacitus reports:

Display in Rome
The name and fame of Caratacus were now known far outside the army of Britain, and he and his family were central attractions in the triumphal parade through the streets of Rome before the Emperor Claudius himself. (After the fall of the Roman Republic, triumphs were celebrated in the name of the reigning emperor.) Caratacus' defeat was publicly likened by the Senators to some of Rome's greatest victories, and Ostorius Scapula was awarded triumphal ornaments for defeating him.

The normal practice would have been for the prisoners to be executed at the end of the triumphal ceremony. Caratacus gave a speech which persuaded Claudius to spare him and his family. 

Tacitus would have been a small child at this time, but he reports Caratacus' words as if he had been taking contemporaneous notes: 

After his liberation, according to Dio Cassius, Caratacus was impressed by the city of Rome:

References

Tacitus, Annals 12:33-38
Sheppard Frere, Britannia: a History of Roman Britain, 3rd edition, 1978, p. 64

50
Caer Caradoc
Caer Caradoc 50
Caer Caradoc 50
Caer Caradoc
History of Shropshire
1st century in Great Britain
50s in the Roman Empire
1st-century battles